Nikita Popov (born July 11, 1992) is a Russian ice hockey defenceman. He is currently playing with Sokol Krasnoyarsk of the Supreme Hockey League (VHL).

Popov made his Kontinental Hockey League debut playing with Severstal Cherepovets during the 2011–12 KHL season.

References

External links

1992 births
Living people
HC Izhstal players
Metallurg Novokuznetsk players
Molot-Prikamye Perm players
Russian ice hockey defencemen
HC Ryazan players
Severstal Cherepovets players
Tsen Tou Jilin City players